Morimotoa is a genus of beetles in the family Dytiscidae, containing the following species:

 Morimotoa gigantea Uéno, 1996
 Morimotoa morimotoi Uéno, 1996
 Morimotoa phreatica Uéno, 1957

References

Dytiscidae